Samuel Smith may refer to:

In politics
Samuel Smith (Connecticut politician) (1646–1735), early settler of Norwalk, Connecticut and deputy of the General Assembly of the Colony of Connecticut in 1691
Samuel Smith (1754–1834), British Member of Parliament for Leicester, Malmesbury, Midhurst, St Germans and Wendover
Samuel Smith (1755–1793), British Member of Parliament for Worcester, Ludgershall and Ilchester
Samuel Smith (North Carolina), 18th-century North Carolina politician
Samuel Smith (Liberal politician) (1836–1906), British Member of Parliament for Liverpool, 1882–1885 and Flintshire, 1886–1906
Samuel Smith Jr., American politician; Democratic member of the Indiana Senate, 1998–2008
Samuel Hardman Smith (1868–1956), Canadian politician; municipal politician in Edmonton
Samuel Smith (Australian politician) (1857–1916), member of the New South Wales Legislative Assembly
Samuel Smith (New York politician), mayor of the City of Brooklyn, New York, 1850
Samuel Smith (Maryland politician) (1752–1839), U.S. Senator and Representative from Maryland
Samuel Smith (New Hampshire politician) (1765–1842), U.S. Representative from New Hampshire
Samuel Smith (Pennsylvania politician), U.S. Representative from Pennsylvania, 1805–1811
Samuel Smith (Upper Canada politician) (1756–1826), American-born Canadian politician; Administrator of Upper Canada, 1817–1818
Samuel A. Smith (1795–1861), U.S. Representative from Pennsylvania
Samuel Axley Smith (1822–1863), U.S. Representative from Tennessee
Samuel E. Smith (1788–1860), American politician; Governor of Maine, 1831–1834
Samuel George Smith (1822–1900), MP for Aylesbury, 1859–1880
Samuel H. Smith (politician) (born 1955), American politician; Speaker of Pennsylvania House of Representatives
Samuel James Smith (1897–1964), Australian politician, New South Wales MLC
Samuel William Smith (1852–1931), American politician; Congressman from Michigan

In education and academia
Samuel Smith, father and son, both English priests and educators:
Samuel Smith (schoolmaster) (died 1808), Headmaster of Westminster School
Samuel Smith (Dean of Christ Church) (1765–1841), Dean of Christ Church, Oxford
Samuel Stanhope Smith (1751–1819), American educator; seventh president of the College of New Jersey (Princeton University)
Samuel Roger Smith (1853–1916), co-founder and first president of Messiah College in Pennsylvania
Sam Smith (psychologist) (1929–2012), second president of Athabasca University
Samuel H. Smith (educator) (born 1940), American educator; president of Washington State University, 1985–2000
Samuel L. Smith, school administrator and architect of Rosenwald schools in the U.S.

In other fields
Samuel Smith (prison chaplain) (1620–1698), Ordinary of Newgate prison
Samuel Smith (photographer) (1802-1892), English photographer aka 'Philosopher' Smith.
Samuel Francis Smith (1808–1895), American Baptist minister, journalist and author; wrote the lyrics to "My Country, 'Tis of Thee"
Samuel Harrison Smith (printer) (1772–1845), American journalist and newspaper publisher, founded the National Intelligencer, 1800
Samuel Smith (chemist) (1927–2005), American scientist; co-inventor of Scotchgard
Samuel Walter Johnson Smith (1871–1948), English physicist
Samuel Smith (watchmaker) (died 1875), founder of Smiths Group
Samuel H. Smith (Latter Day Saints) (1808–1844), American Latter-day Saint; Book of Mormon witness, missionary, and brother of Joseph Smith, Jr.
Samuel J. Smith, Baptist missionary, printer and publisher in Siam
Samuel Pountney Smith (1812–1883), English architect
Samuel Smith (winemaker) (1812–1889), South Australian pioneer who founded Yalumba
African-American victim of the Lynching of Samuel Smith (1924)
Samuel Timothy Smith, birth name of Tim McGraw (born 1967), American country singer

See also
Sam Smith (disambiguation)
Samantha Smith (disambiguation)
Samuel Smith Brewery, British brewery founded by a local brewer of the same name
Samuel L. Smith House, home of Michigan entrepreneur